The Arlington Fly-In, also known as the Arlington Air Show, is an annual airshow hosted in Arlington, Washington at the Arlington Municipal Airport (IATA airport code AWO). Thousands of general aviation pilots fly in from around the country and camp for up to four days, many showing their aircraft for judging.

The Northwest Fly-In is the third largest in the nation, after Oshkosh's EAA AirVenture Oshkosh and Lakeland's Sun N' Fun.

Until 2008, the event was known as the Northwest EAA Fly-In. It was moved from July to August in 2019 because of scheduling issues with other city events.

References

External links
Arlington Fly-In website

Air shows in the United States
Arlington, Washington
Aviation in Washington (state)
Events in Washington (state)
Tourist attractions in Snohomish County, Washington